The 2010 San Jose Earthquakes season was the club's thirteenth season of existence. The Earthquakes finished 8th overall in MLS and finished in the Eastern Conference finals of the MLS Cup playoffs before losing to the Colorado Rapids. It was the first season the club made the playoffs since 2005.

Squad
As of October 14, 2010.

Management

Other information

Transfers

In

Out

Loans in

Loans out

Released

Review

Preseason 

For the second straight year, the Earthquakes played at PDL team Fresno Fuego. The Quakes trained in London for ten days and went 3-0 against fellow MLS side Colorado Rapids and the reserve teams of West Ham United and Tottenham Hotspur. San Jose will also have a game against the Houston Dynamo in San Francisco on March 17 and a home game on March 20 against future MLS rival Portland Timbers.

March 

San Jose will begin its thirteenth Major League Soccer regular season at home with a match against Real Salt Lake on March 27, 2010 followed by a road match against the Chicago Fire on April 10, 2010.

May 
The Quakes tallied four straight shutouts and a 393-minute scoreless streak, which ended with a 3-1 home loss to Toronto F.C. on May 29.

October 
With a win October 9 over D.C. United, the Earthquakes clinched their first trip to the postseason since 2005.

Friendlies

Competitions

Major League Soccer

Regular season

League table

Conference

Overall

Results summary

Results by matchday

Results

Playoffs

U.S. Open Cup

Qualification

Squad statistics

Appearances and goals

|-
|colspan="14"|Players away from San Jose Earthquakes on loan:
|-
|colspan="14"|Players who left San Jose Earthquakes during the season:

|}

Goal scorers

Disciplinary record

Notes

References

San Jose Earthquakes seasons
San Jose Earthquakes
San Jose Earthquakes
San Jose Earthquakes